The Entity is the debut album by American underground rapper King Gordy. It was released on June 24, 2003 via Web Entertainment. The record featured guest appearances by the likes of fellow Detroit-based rappers Bizarre, Obie Trice, and the Fat Killahz. The audio production was handled by Eminem, Luis Resto, The 45 King, the Almighty Dreadnaughtz (0-1, Blitz, Cysion, Hex Murda, Konphlict), and Bass Brothers (among others), who also served as executive producers of the album.

Gordy released a music video for the song "Nightmares".

Track listing 

Notes
 signifies an additional producer.
 signifies a co-producer.

Personnel
Adapted from AllMusic.

Jeff Bass – bass, engineer, executive producer, guitar, keyboards, producer
Mark Bass – A&R, executive producer, mixing, producer
Akane Behrens – engineer
Rick Behrens – engineer
Cysion – producer
Shabazz Ford – rap vocals
Andy Gallacher – vocals
Brian "Big Bass" Gardner – mastering
Eugene Howell – A&R, producer
Richard Hunt – assistant engineer
Rufus Johnson – rap vocals
Steve King – bass, engineer, guitar, mixing, producer
Joel Martin – A&R, executive producer
Luis Resto – keyboards, producer
Konnie Ross – producer
Shim-E-Bango – rap vocals
Silent Riot – producer
Michael Strange Jr. – engineer, mixing, producer
Obie Trice – featured artist
Shaphan "Maestro" Williams – vocals
Marv Won – rap vocals
0–1 – producer
Waverly W. Alford III – rap vocals
Marshall Mathers - producer on tracks 2, 3, 6, 10
Additional musicians
Brandy Nicole Ellis – background vocals on track 6
Jennifer Bostick – background vocals on track 16
Ray Gale – harmonica on track 10
Salvador Tempo – additional vocals on track 15
Stephani Singleton – background vocals on track 16
Wayne Gerard – producer, guitar on track 15

References

King Gordy albums
2003 debut albums
Web Entertainment albums
Albums produced by Eminem
Albums produced by the 45 King